SPO:) is a Lithuanian monthly sports magazine owned by media conglomerate UAB MKG. SPO:) is the first and currently only magazine in Lithuania dedicated to recent developments in various sports. Its first issue was published in January 2005. SPO:) includes a large number of color photographs, scouting reports from NBA and Euroleague, and posters in the center of the magazine.

Sportsman of the Month
Since its inception in 2005, SPO:) magazine has annually presented the Sportsman of the Month award to "the Lithuanian athlete whose performance that month most embodies the spirit of sportsmanship and achievement."

References

External links
 Official website

2005 establishments in Lithuania
Magazines published in Lithuania
Lithuanian-language magazines
Magazines established in 2005
Monthly magazines
Sports magazines